Al Melgard (October 4, 1890 in Denmark – July 8, 1977) was the best-known organist for the Chicago Stadium, from 1930 until retirement in 1974, at age 84.

Career
Melgard, who lost his left index finger in an accident as a child, was nonetheless a highly acclaimed musician and played the Stadium's world-famous Barton theater organ masterfully. He played at nearly two thousand Chicago Blackhawks hockey games and over four hundred Chicago Bulls basketball games, as well as hundreds of professional boxing matches and countless other Chicago Stadium events.

He was arguably the first sports arena organist to match songs to events during games and his favorite target was the referee. When National Hockey League Hall of Fame defenceman and later referee Francis "King" Clancy called a penalty, Melgard would play "Clancy Lowered the Boom". Sometime in the late 1950s, he decided to greet the referee and linesmen when they came onto the ice before the start of the game with "Three Blind Mice". This practice ended quickly after a tersely worded order from NHL president Clarence Campbell.

Melgard's most notable performance came during a boxing match at Chicago Stadium during the 1940s. As the story (fact mixed with some fiction) goes, the fight ended with an extremely unpopular decision. The capacity crowd became unruly and a riot on the floor broke out with folding chairs flying. Melgard supposedly tried to calm the uproar with a religious song and then "The Star-Spangled Banner". When that didn't work, Melgard opened up most of the 800-plus stops on the huge Barton organ, floored the volume pedal and laid his hands flat on the middle keyboards. The resulting sound blew out many of the lights over the arena floor. Stunned, the fans stopped fighting, picked up their hats and coats, and exited the building.

Albums
Melgard made four record albums with the Stadium organ under the Audio Fidelity label ( bong wrong - 6 plus 5 78's ) Stereo was new technology in the late 1950s, and several labels went looking for creative ways to demonstrate the lifelike stereo sound. Using several strategically placed microphones, Audio Fidelity was able to capture both the strength and nuances of the massive organ, as well as highlight Melgard's talents. The producers thought they had failed miserably when they heard a significant hiss throughout all of the tapes during editing, but the noise turned out to be the twin 100-horsepower blowers, manufactured by Spencer Turbine Co., that powered the organ.  The resulting sound was high quality, the albums did well commercially, and they are now collectors' items. Prior to the Audio Fidelity recordings, Al Melgard recorded four albums on two smaller, lesser known local labels, Replica and Halifax. One of the Replica albums,"This Is Melgard" was recorded on a studio Wurlitzer organ. Volume 1 of the Replica recordings contains the selection "My Vision", Al's own composition, which was the last song played after every Chicago Blackhawk game at the Stadium. It was speculated this selection was composed by Al for Sojna Henie who performed at the Stadium as part of Arthur Wirtz's "Hollywood Ice Revue"

Personal life
Melgard was born in Denmark, but his family moved to Chicago when he was six months of age. He grew up in the city and attended Hyde Park High School there.

After retiring, Melgard moved to Las Vegas and died in 1977 at the age of 87.

References

1890 births
1977 deaths
Stadium organists
American male organists
20th-century organists
20th-century American male musicians